Frederick John Champion de Crespigny (12 December 1822 – 25 June 1887) was an English first-class cricketer active 1843–51 who played for Nottinghamshire. He was born in Camberwell; died in Hampton Wick.

He was educated at Magdalene College, Cambridge. After graduating he became a Church of England priest and was perpetual curate at Emmanuel Church, Camberwell, from 1850 to 1858, then vicar of Hampton Wick from 1858 until his death.

References

1822 births
1887 deaths
English cricketers
Nottinghamshire cricketers
Cambridge University cricketers
Alumni of Magdalene College, Cambridge
19th-century English Anglican priests
Gentlemen of England cricketers